The 2001–02 season was Ulster Rugby's seventh under professionalism, and their first under head coach Alan Solomons. They competed in the Heineken Cup, the IRFU Interprovincial Championship, and the inaugural Celtic League. Flanker Andy Ward was captain.

Solomons, former assistant coach of South Africa and the Western Stormers, was appointed in January to succeed Harry Williams in June. Mark McCall remained assistant coach. Former Springboks assistant coach Phil Mack, who had worked with Solomons with the Stormers, was appointed fitness advisor in place of Mike Bull. Hooker Allen Clarke retired from playing and was named Director of Elite Player Development, establishing Ulster's first academy programme.

The Irish, Scottish and Welsh unions agreed a format for the inaugural Celtic League in May 2001. It would involve all four Irish provinces, two teams from Scotland and nine from Wales, organised in two conferences. It would kick off on 18 August, with the final scheduled for 15 December. Celtic league fixtures between Ulster and Leinster, and between Munster and Connacht, would count towards this year's IRFU Interprovincial Championship. The remaining Interprovincial fixtures would take place in April 2002.

In the Celtic League, Ulster finished second in Pool A, qualifying for the playoffs. They beat Neath in the quarter-final, but lost to Munster in the semi-final. David Humphreys was the league's leading scorer with 122 points, and the "leading marksman" with 39 successful goal kicks. In the Heineken Cup, they finished second in Pool 2, missing out on the knockout stage. They finished second in the Interprovincial Championship, qualifying for next season's Heineken Cup. David Humphreys was Ulster's Player of the Year. Lock Gary Longwell made his 100th appearance for Ulster in October 2001.

Player transfers

Players in
  David Allen
  Robby Brink from Western Province
  Kieran Campbell from London Irish
  Mark Crick from New South Wales
  Bryn Cunningham from Dungannon RFC
  Jeremy Davidson from Castres
  Leopoldo de Chazal
  Aidan Kearney from UCD
  Adam Larkin from Castres
  Matt McCullough from Ballymena R.F.C.
  Matt Sexton from Canterbury
  Paddy Wallace from UCD
  Scott Young from Ballymena R.F.C.

Players out
  Stephen Bell to Bedford Blues
  John Campbell (released to reserve list)
  Allen Clarke (retired)
  Grant Henderson to South Africa
  Dion O'Cuinneagain to Munster

Squad

2001–02 Heineken Cup

Pool 2

2001-02 Celtic League

Pool A Table

Pool A Fixtures

Quarter final

Semi final

2001-02 IRFU Interprovincial Championship

Celtic League pool matches between Irish provinces count towards the Interprovincial Championship.

Friendlies

Ulster Rugby Awards
The Ulster Rugby Awards ceremony was held on 23 May 2002. Winners were:

Ulster player of the year: David Humphreys
Ulster Supporters' Club player of the year: David Humphreys
Guinness personality of the year: Paddy Wallace
Ulster schools player of the year: Lewis Stevenson
Coach of the year: Andre Bester, Belfast Harlequins
Youth player of the year: Oisin Hennessey
Club of the year: Ballynahinch RFC
Dorrington B Faulker Memorial Award for services to rugby: Dick Hinds, formerly of Omagh Academy
PRO/Media Prize: Terry Jackson, Dungannon RFC

Season reviews
"Andy Ward's Thoughts On The Season", Ulster Rugby, 15 May 2002, archived 9 July 2002

References

2001-02
Ulster
Ulster
Ulster